Aechmea comata is a species of flowering plant in the Bromeliaceae family. This species is endemic to southern Brazil.

Infraspecifics
Varieties
 Aechmea comata var. makoyana (Mez) L.B. Smith

Cultivars
Many cultivars have been created, including:

 Aechmea 'Covata'
 Aechmea 'Covata Too'
 Aechmea 'Golden Comet'
 Aechmea 'Gotha'
 Aechmea 'Julian Nally'
 Aechmea 'Keith's Comet'

References

comata
Flora of Brazil
Plants described in 1852
Taxa named by John Gilbert Baker
Taxa named by Charles Gaudichaud-Beaupré